Robert Bruce Kempson (born 23 February 1974 in Queenstown, South Africa) is a  South African former rugby union footballer, and the Director of High Performance and interim head coach of the  in Pro14.

His regular position was prop.

Rugby career

Playing career

When Kempson was still attending Queen's College, in Queenstown, he was selected to play in the South Africa Schools side. After school, he joined , where he played his first class rugby until 1998.

Kempson was selected to represent South Africa at various youth or development levels; in 1994, he represented the South Africa Under-23 team and later in the same year, he toured with a South Africa Development side to the United Kingdom.

On 20 June 1998, he finally made his test debut, playing off the bench in their match against  in a mid-year rugby union international.

However, he failed to be selected in the South Africa side that competed at the 1999 Rugby World Cup, instead joining Welsh side Newport on a short-term basis, here he joined fellow South Africans Gary Teichmann, Franco Smith and Andy Marinos.

He returned to South Africa to play for the Stormers and Western Province in 2000 and 2001, also forcing his way back into Springbok selection. However, a neck operation at the start of 2002 ruled him out of the entire 2002 Super 12 season. He then signed a deal with Irish side Ulster, where he joined former Stormers coach Alan Solomons. He did return to South Africa to play Stormers during the 2003 Super 12 season and appeared for the Springboks in the 2003 Tri Nations Series – where South Africa's 9–29 defeat to  turned out to be Kempson's final test match for South Africa – before returning to Ulster.

When Solomons left Ulster to join English Premiership side Northampton Saints, he also lured Kempson across the Irish Sea. However, Kempson's time in Northampton was marred by injuries and he was released after just one season.

Coaching career

References

South African rugby union coaches
South African rugby union players
South African people of English descent
Living people
1974 births
People from Queenstown, South Africa
Rugby union props
Sharks (Currie Cup) players
Sharks (rugby union) players
Stormers players
Western Province (rugby union) players
South Africa international rugby union players
White South African people
Rugby union players from the Eastern Cape
Ulster Rugby players
Alumni of Queen's College Boys' High School